Yan Hong (阎红, born 23 October 1966) is a retired Chinese race walker.

International competitions

See also
China at the World Championships in Athletics

References

 

1966 births
Living people
Chinese female racewalkers
Universiade medalists in athletics (track and field)
Universiade silver medalists for China
Medalists at the 1985 Summer Universiade
World Athletics Championships medalists
World Athletics Indoor Championships medalists
World Athletics Race Walking Team Championships winners
Japan Championships in Athletics winners
World record setters in athletics (track and field)